Rytis Daukantas is a Lithuanian architect and contemporary artist.

References
 Samogitian Cultural Association 
 The Cartoon Movement

External links
 KARIKATURA.LT cartoon website by Rytis Daukantas

Lithuanian artists
Living people
1980 births
Place of birth missing (living people)
Lithuanian architects